is a Japanese wrestler who won four world titles and two Asian Wrestling Championships in her career.

Her father is Ikuei Yamamoto, who also competed in the Olympics as a wrestler. Her older brother is mixed martial artist Norifumi Yamamoto. Her sister Miyuu Yamamoto is female wrestler and mixed martial artist who won three world titles and one Asian Wrestling Championship in her career.

In four years from 1999 till 2003, she collected four gold medals at the World Wrestling Championships. Because she lost at the Japan Queen's Cup to Saori Yoshida, she was unable to participate at the 2004 Summer Olympics. In 2006 she married team handball player Hideaki Nagashima and later retired, and in 2007 gave birth to a son. Two years later she came back and won another championship at the Poland Open.

On July 30, 2015, San Diego Padres pitcher Yu Darvish announced on Twitter Yamamoto gave birth to their son on July 29.

Awards
Tokyo Sports
Wrestling Special Award (1999, 2000, 2001, 2003)

References

Japanese female sport wrestlers
Living people
1980 births
World Wrestling Championships medalists
21st-century Japanese women